The Bristol and Exeter Railway 0-6-0T locomotives were two different types of locomotives built for the Bristol and Exeter Railway. On 1 January 1876 the Bristol and Exeter Railway was amalgamated with the Great Western Railway, after which the locomotives were given new numbers.

List of locomotives

Broad gauge

Two small  broad gauge locomotives. The first had a 950 gallon tank, the second had a larger 1,200 gallon one.

 75 (1866 – 1888) GWR No. 2092
 76 (1867 – 1890) GWR No. 2093

Standard gauge

Two standard gauge  locomotives built for the Culm Valley Light Railway which was then under construction. They were operated on the line until 1881, when they were superseded by 1298 and 1300, two  locomotives which had started life as South Devon Railway locomotives.

 114 (1874 – 1934) GWR No. 1376
 115 (1875 – 1927) GWR No. 1377

References
 
 
 

Broad gauge (7 feet) railway locomotives
0-6-0T locomotives
Bristol and Exeter Railway locomotives
Railway locomotives introduced in 1866
Standard gauge steam locomotives of Great Britain
Scrapped locomotives